A sunshine list is a listing of salary, benefit and severance information. Its colloquial name refers to the goal of illuminating government expenditures. In Canada, the list is commonly used for example by provincial or municipal governments to identify any publicly employed person making $100,000 salary or higher. The purpose of the list is to provide accountability and transparency. For example, the province of Ontario requires "organizations that receive public funding from the Province of Ontario to disclose annually the names, positions, salaries and total taxable benefits of employees paid $100,000 or more in a calendar year."

History

Alberta
Alberta first started publishing a sunshine list in 2014 following the 2012 election of Alison Redford. The introduction of the list followed public debate about the severance awarded to Redford's former chief of staff. In Alberta, the policy applies to deputy ministers, senior officials, political staff appointed under the Executive Assistant Order and employees defined under the Public Service Act who work for the offices of ministers and associate ministers, and who make an annual base salary of at least $100,000. The government began disclosing base salaries, benefit and severance amounts, and details of contract and termination agreements beginning on 31 January 2014. Information was to be posted online twice annually no later than 30 June and 31 December and included all staff employed as of 23 April 2012.

Nova Scotia
The government of Halifax has released a sunshine list annually since 2016.

Ontario
Ontario introduced the sunshine list in 1996 under the Mike Harris government.

Uses
While intended as an accountability tool, the lists have been used for other purposes. Maclean's magazine, for example, has used the list to examine employment equity in academia.

Flaw
In 2011, Chris Mazza, President and CEO of Ornge, managed to stay off the sunshine list while making $1.4 million per year in a controversial scandal.

References

External links
Search the Ontario sunshine list

1996 establishments in Ontario
2014 establishments in Alberta
Accountability
Fiscal policy
Publications established in 1996
Publications established in 2014
Recurring events established in 1996
Recurring events established in 2014